Norman Takanyariwa Mapeza (born 12 April 1972) is a Zimbabwean football coach and former player. During his career, he played as a defender and midfielder.

Club career
Mapeza began his playing career with Darryn Textiles F.C. in Harare. He moved to Europe to play with Sokół Pniewy in the Polish Ekstraklasa for the 1993–94 season. Mapeza next played for several clubs in the Turkish Super Lig, including Galatasaray S.K., Ankaragücü, Altay S.K. and Malatyaspor.

He was only the second Zimbabwean player to play in the UEFA Champions League, appearing in the competition with Galatasaray in the 1990s.

Coaching career
In the 2003–04 season, Mapeza functioned as a playing assistant coach at CAPS United and later in a similar role for Ajax Cape Town in the 2005–06 season. He ended his playing career in the summer 2006.

In July 2007, Mapeza was appointed manager of Monomotapa United back in Zimbabwe. He resigned from his position later in 2008 . In August and September 2007, Mapeza also took charge of Zimbabwe's national football team on interim basis.

In the beginning of May 2009, Mapeza was appointed caretaker manager of Zimbabwe once again. He resigned in November 2010.

In March 2011, Mapeza was again appointed Zimbabwe manager for a third spell in four years. In February 2012, he was suspended from his job as Zimbabwe's national football team manager for alleged match-fixing.

On 11 August 2014, Mapeza was appointed manager of F.C. Platinum. And in March 2017, Mapeza was also appointed caretaker manager of Zimbabwe for the fourth time until November 2017. Mapeza left his position at Platinum on 12 September 2019 and was appointed the manager of the South African PSL team Chippa United on 1 October 2019. He left Chippa in March 2020.

In November 2020, Mapeza returned to F.C. Platinum as the clubs new manager.

On 15 September 2021, Mapeza was appointed caretaker manager of the Zimbabwe's national football team.

References

External links

1972 births
Living people
Zimbabwean footballers
Zimbabwean expatriate footballers
Zimbabwe international footballers
Sokół Pniewy players
Galatasaray S.K. footballers
MKE Ankaragücü footballers
Altay S.K. footballers
Dardanelspor footballers
Denizlispor footballers
SV Ried players
Malatyaspor footballers
CAPS United players
Cape Town Spurs F.C. players
Süper Lig players
Expatriate footballers in Poland
Expatriate footballers in Turkey
Expatriate footballers in Austria
Expatriate soccer players in South Africa
Zimbabwean expatriate sportspeople in Poland
Zimbabwean expatriate sportspeople in Turkey
Zimbabwean expatriate sportspeople in Austria
Zimbabwean expatriate sportspeople in South Africa
Zimbabwe national football team managers
Association football midfielders
Association football defenders
Zimbabwean football managers
Chippa United F.C. managers